John Gerald Kelly (14 December 1935 – 9 May 2012) was a Scottish professional footballer who played as a right half.

Career
Born in Glasgow, Kelly played for Shettleston, Third Lanark, Crewe Alexandra, Celtic, Greenock Morton, Barnsley and Cork Hibernians.

References

1935 births
2012 deaths
Scottish footballers
Footballers from Glasgow
Scottish Junior Football Association players
Glasgow United F.C. players
Third Lanark A.C. players
Crewe Alexandra F.C. players
Celtic F.C. players
Greenock Morton F.C. players
Barnsley F.C. players
Cork Hibernians F.C. players
Scottish Football League players
English Football League players
Association football wing halves